Cora Daniela Olivero Bergese (born 28 August 1978 in Córdoba, Argentina) is a retired Spanish athlete who specialised in the 400 metres hurdles. She represented Spain at the 2004 Summer Olympics without qualifying for the semifinals.

Olivero changed allegiance from her native Argentina in 1998. She still holds several Argentine records.

Competition record

Personal bests
Outdoor
200 metres – 23.88 (-0.4 m/s) (Madrid 2003)
400 metres – 53.20 (Getafe 2003)
100 metres hurdles – 13.36 (Valladolid 2002)
400 metres hurdles – 55.27 (Almería 2005)
Indoor
200 metres – 25.06 (Oviedo 2003)
400 metres – 53.68 (Madrid 2005)
60 metres hurdles – 8.53 (Valencia 2002)

References

1978 births
Living people
Spanish female hurdlers
Argentine female hurdlers
Athletes (track and field) at the 2004 Summer Olympics
Olympic athletes of Spain
World Athletics Championships athletes for Spain
Sportspeople from Córdoba, Argentina
Argentine emigrants to Spain
Mediterranean Games silver medalists for Spain
Mediterranean Games medalists in athletics
Athletes (track and field) at the 2005 Mediterranean Games
Competitors at the 2005 Summer Universiade